The United States Bankruptcy Court for the Eastern and Western Districts of Arkansas Arkansas is the federal bankruptcy court in Arkansas; it is the only bankruptcy court in the nation spanning two Districts.   It is associated with the United States District Court for the Eastern District of Arkansas and the United States District Court for the Western District of Arkansas.   The court’s main office is based in Little Rock with a divisional office in Fayetteville.

Jurisdiction 
The Eastern District of Arkansas is divided into five divisions:

The Western District of Arkansas is divided into six divisions:

Judges

Former Judges/Referees

Clerks of Court

History 
The Bankruptcy Act of 1898 (Act of July 1, 1898, ch. 541) was the first permanent bankruptcy law and remained in effect until the passage of the Bankruptcy Reform Act of 1978 (November 6, 1978).  The 1898 Act created "courts of bankruptcy" defined as the district courts of the United States.  The 1898 Act also created the office of referee.  The referee was appointed for two-year terms by the District Court.  The 1978 Act established United States bankruptcy courts in each federal judicial district with their own clerks and other staff.  The first bankruptcy clerk's office was located at the Richard Sheppard Arnold United States Post Office and Courthouse, 600 W. Capitol Avenue, Little Rock, Arkansas.  In 1993, a staffed divisional office was opened in the John Paul Hammerschmidt Federal Building in Fayetteville, Arkansas.   In 1997, the bankruptcy court moved to its current location in the newly renovated Old Post Office and Courthouse (aka Old Post Office and Customs House or the Old Federal Building) located at 300 W. 2nd Street in Little Rock.

District/Divisional History

References

External links 
 U. S. Bankruptcy Court for the Eastern and Western Districts of Arkansas official website

Arkansas
Arkansas law
Courts and tribunals with year of establishment missing